Interstate 80 (I-80) is a major Interstate Highway in the United States, running from San Francisco, California, eastward to the New York metropolitan area. I-95 continues from the end of I-80 to the George Washington Bridge for access to New York City. The highway runs parallel to U.S. Route 46 (US 46) through rural areas of Warren and Sussex counties before heading into more suburban surroundings in Morris County. As the road continues into Passaic and Bergen counties, it heads into more urban areas. The New Jersey Department of Transportation (NJDOT) identifies I-80 within the state as the Christopher Columbus Highway.

A freeway along the I-80 corridor had been planned in 1936 and again in 1955 to provide relief along US 46 between the George Washington Bridge and the Delaware Water Gap. With the establishment of the Interstate Highway System, the planned freeway, which had been identified in some planning documents as the Bergen–Passaic Expressway, was incorporated into I-80. The freeway was built across New Jersey in stages from the 1960s to 1973. The westernmost  in New Jersey was originally a rerouting of US 611 when built, although that route was later realigned back into Pennsylvania. In the 1990s, high-occupancy vehicle lanes (HOV lanes) had existed on a part of I-80 in Morris County, but the HOV lanes were opened to regular traffic because they were not used frequently.

Route description

Warren and Sussex counties 

I-80 enters Hardwick Township, Warren County, from Pennsylvania on the Delaware Water Gap Toll Bridge over the Delaware River, maintained by the Delaware River Joint Toll Bridge Commission (DRJTBC). In addition to carrying I-80, this bridge also carries the Appalachian Trail over the Delaware River. From this point, the four-lane freeway heads south along the east bank of the river through the Delaware Water Gap, immediately reaching a westbound exit and eastbound entrance for Old Mine Road. Now maintained by NJDOT, the road makes a sharp turn to the east and comes to a U-turn ramp in both directions that also has access to the Appalachian Trail. The highway heads south again and enters Knowlton Township, where it comes to another set of U-turn ramps that also includes a weigh station in the eastbound direction. After turning southeast and leaving the Delaware Water Gap, the road has a westbound right-in/right-out for Hainesburg Road before crossing under the abandoned Delaware River Viaduct of the Lackawanna Cut-Off. East of the viaduct, I-80 widens to six lanes and reaches a complex interchange with the western terminus of US 46, Route 94, and Decatur Street in Columbia, where development near the route increases. After this interchange, the freeway turns east away from the Delaware River and crosses over Paulins Kill before it continues through wooded and hilly areas containing some farms, with the eastbound direction widening from three to four lanes, and the highway median also widens. A scenic overlook of the Delaware Water Gap is located in the westbound direction while a rest area is located in the eastbound direction.

Upon crossing into Blairstown, the eastbound direction narrows down to three lanes. In Hope Township, I-80 reaches an interchange with County Route 521 (CR 521) that also provides access to CR 519 and the Land of Make Believe amusement park. The highway widens to eight lanes briefly after this interchange before narrowing to six lanes. In Frelinghuysen Township, the freeway carries four lanes eastbound and three lanes westbound. Upon coming into Allamuchy Township, I-80 has six lanes before gaining a fourth eastbound lane as it comes to the CR 517 exit, providing access to Allamuchy Mountain State Park. Following this, the road runs through densely forested areas of the park, coming to two pairs of rest areas with no facilities in both directions. The eastbound direction becomes three lanes again before the road passes through Byram Township in Sussex County.

Morris and Essex counties 

Upon crossing the Musconetcong River, I-80 enters Mount Olive Township in Morris County and passes through more woodland with a narrower median. The road comes to a trumpet interchange with US 206 and forms a concurrency with that route as it bypasses Netcong to the south. After turning southeast and passing near suburban business parks, the highway crosses over NJ Transit's Morristown Line/Montclair-Boonton Line and reaches a partial interchange with US 46, which has only a westbound exit and eastbound entrance. The freeway crosses a small corner of Netcong and Mount Olive Township again before continuing into Roxbury, where it comes to a modified cloverleaf interchange. At this interchange, Route 183 heads north into Netcong and US 206 splits from I-80 by heading south. The road continues through wooded areas containing some suburban development as it comes to the CR 631 interchange, which also provides access to eastbound US 46. The road crosses the NJ Transit line again and parallels it a short distance to the north as it comes into Mount Arlington and reaches the Howard Boulevard exit, serving Mount Arlington station. I-80 continues back into Roxbury and comes to a westbound truck rest area with the eastbound one being abandoned. After this, the road heads farther north of the railroad tracks and briefly passes through Jefferson and Rockaway townships before continuing into Wharton. Here, the freeway has an eastbound exit to CR 634 that provides access to Route 15 before it reaches the interchange with Route 15 proper that lacks an eastbound exit.

The highway continues back into Rockaway Township as it widens to eight lanes and comes to the CR 661 exit near the Rockaway Townsquare shopping mall. Suburban development near the highway becomes more dense at this point as I-80 briefly passes through a corner of Rockaway borough before coming to the interchange with CR 513 in Rockaway Township. The freeway passes over the Dover and Rockaway River Railroad's Dover and Rockaway Branch and turns southeast here into Denville Township. In the center of Denville Township, it has an eastbound exit and westbound entrance serving US 46 that also provides access to Route 53. There is a westbound exit and eastbound entrance serving both US 46 and Route 53 as the road begins to turn more to the east. I-80 turns south and crosses the Montclair-Boonton Line for a third time before it enters Parsippany–Troy Hills. The highway makes a turn east as it comes into an area of business parks, with the median widening before an interchange serving US 202 and CR 654. The median narrows again before I-80 reaches the I-287 interchange that also has movements to US 46 and Smith Road to and from the east.

Past I-287, I-80 gains local–express lanes with a 2-3-3-2 configuration. The road continues past more commercial areas, with the local lanes having an eastbound exit and westbound entrance at CR 637. After this, there is a large interchange with US 46 and the western terminus of I-280, at which point the local–express lanes end. From this point, I-80 continues east through wooded areas as a six-lane freeway, crossing into Montville, where there is a partial interchange providing access to Hook Mountain Road. After a turn to the northeast, the highway comes into Fairfield Township, Essex County, continuing through wooded surroundings as it heads north before turning east. Development near the road increases as it comes to the westbound exit and eastbound entrance with CR 613.

Passaic and Bergen counties 

After crossing the Passaic River again, I-80 enters Wayne in Passaic County. Here, the road passes under the Montclair-Boonton Line before coming to the spaghetti junction with Route 23 and US 46 near the Willowbrook Mall. At this point, the freeway widens to eight lanes and continues into Totowa, passing near more commercial areas and over a Norfolk Southern Railway railroad line as it comes to an interchange with CR 642 that has access to and from the west. A short distance later, there is a westbound exit and eastbound entrance serving Route 62 and CR 646. I-80 crosses the Passaic River a third time and enters Woodland Park, where it turns to the northeast past suburban neighborhoods and reaches an interchange serving CR 636. Passing to the north of Garret Mountain Reservation, the freeway enters Paterson and turns east into urban areas as it comes to the interchange at the Route 19 freeway. After Route 19, I-80 runs above Paterson on a viaduct, crossing over NJ Transit's Main Line before coming to the exit for CR 649 (Madison Avenue). The road returns to ground level near urban neighborhoods as it comes to an eastbound exit and westbound entrance serving Market Street before reaching an interchange with Route 20.

After a fourth crossing of the Passaic River, I-80 comes into Elmwood Park in Bergen County and reaches the CR 507 exit. It continues near suburban neighborhoods, coming to a bridge over New York, Susquehanna and Western Railway's (NYSW) New Jersey Subdivision line, and passes over NJ Transit's Bergen County Line as it comes to an interchange with the Garden State Parkway on the border of Elmwood Park and Saddle Brook that also has connections to CR 67. At the Garden State Parkway, I-80 gains a 2-2 local–express lane configuration eastbound while the westbound direction carries four lanes. The next interchange along the road is with CR 79 and is a westbound entrance and an eastbound exit accessible from the local lanes. The freeway passes over the NYSW line again and turns south along the west bank of the Saddle River, eventually crossing it into Lodi. Immediately after, there is a diamond interchange at Riverview Avenue that provides access to Route 4 and Route 17. Heading southeast, I-80 passes over NYSW's Lodi Branch line and comes to an interchange at Route 17, which provides access to US 46 to the south, Route 4 to the north, and various local roads. At this point, I-80 runs between the travel lanes of Route 17 as it continues into Hackensack. Past Route 17, I-80 gains a 3-2-2-3 local–express lane configuration and crosses NJ Transit's Pascack Valley Line before passing through industrial parks and running through a small part of South Hackensack. Here, there is an interchange to Green Street before the highway comes into Teterboro. Turning east, the freeway runs through South Hackensack before entering Hackensack, where an exit provides access to CR 124 (Hudson Street). The road passes near neighborhoods before crossing the Hackensack River into Ridgefield Park, where it passes over NYSW's New Jersey Subdivision line and CSX Transportation's River Subdivision line before there is an exit for 2nd Street. The freeway passes through a corner of Bogota before it continues into Teaneck. In Teaneck, I-80 reaches its eastern terminus at the interchange with I-95 (the New Jersey Turnpike). From here, one can head southbound on I-95 on the turnpike toward Newark or head northbound toward the George Washington Bridge and New York City.

History 

A freeway along the I-80 corridor was first planned in 1936 as a replacement for the cross-state US 46, running from the George Washington Bridge west to the Delaware Water Gap and Scranton, Pennsylvania. After World War II, New Jersey officials considered the proposal again in 1955. Coming off the George Washington Bridge, Route 4 and US 46 already provided high-speed corridors, but they were overloaded, and so a new corridor in between, the Bergen–Passaic Expressway, was planned to run from the bridge to Paterson. The planned route west to the Delaware Water Gap was designated in 1956 as Federal Aid Interstate Route 101 by the New Jersey State Highway Department. It first received the I-82 designation before finally becoming a part of I-80 in 1958. The easternmost section of the route, leading to the bridge, had become part of I-95.

The section of I-80 through the Delaware Water Gap had already opened on December 16, 1953, running from the Delaware Water Gap Toll Bridge to Route 94 at Columbia. This road was signed as a realignment of US 611 from Pennsylvania, later receiving the I-80 designation. The old alignment of US 611 in Pennsylvania had become US 611 Alternate (US 611 Alt). By 1966, I-80 had been completed from Netcong to Denville and from Paterson to I-95. By 1969, the section between I-280 in Parsippany–Troy Hills and Route 23 in Wayne was finished. Also around this time, US 611 was moved off I-80 and back into Pennsylvania, replacing US 611 Alt. By 1971, the section between Wayne and Paterson was completed along with the part between US 202 and I-280. A  section between US 46 in Denville and US 202 in Parsippany–Troy Hills, was opened in September 1973. Also in 1973, the section between US 206 in Netcong and US 46 and Route 94 in Columbia was completed, and the interchange in Columbia was realigned into a complex array of ramps.

In 1982, two rest areas along I-80 were closed due to chronic use for illegal activities. The rest area in Lodi, next to westbound exit 63, closed on June 30, and the rest area at Roxbury in Morris County closed in October. However, the latter reopened on August 14, 1991, for trucks only.

In the 1990s, HOV lanes were built along I-80 between Rockaway and Parsippany–Troy Hills. These HOV lanes, along with the ones that had been built on I-287, were opened to regular traffic in 1998 due to lack of usage, and the state did not have to repay the federal government the $240 million (equivalent to $ in ) to build the lanes. 

On June 22, 2001, a tanker crashed on a westbound bridge on I-80 in Denville, causing a fiery explosion that damaged the bridge and forced its demolition. A temporary bridge had to be built, and traffic on this part of I-80 as well as adjacent roads was snarled; in addition, a state of emergency had been declared for Morris County. The new I-80 bridge opened in September 2001.

I-80, like many other highways in New Jersey, once had solar powered emergency callboxes every , however, with the advent of cellphones, the usage of these callboxes became extremely limited. To save on maintenance costs, NJDOT removed these callboxes in 2005.

In August 2012, NJDOT announced a $73-million (equivalent to $ in ) project will completely rehabilitate and improve I-80 eastbound between US 202 and the Beverwyck Road interchange, a very busy part of highway with an average of 159,000 vehicles traveling it daily.

In 1994, NJDOT adopted and began using the Rockfall Hazard Rating System for evaluating and ranking highway rock-cut slopes. The segment of I-80 between mileposts 1.04 and 1.45, has been continually characterized as having the highest rockfall hazard rating scores in the state. Nine rockfall incidents and one fatality have been reported between 2001 and 2016. In June 2019, NJDOT held a public meeting regarding a proposed rock wall along I-80 in the Delaware Water Gap National Recreation Area. The $60-million project, dubbed the "Jurassic Park fence", would involve the construction of a  metal fence between milemarker 1.04 and 1.05 to prevent rocks from falling onto the highway.

Exit list

Auxiliary routes 
 , known locally as the Essex Freeway

See also

References

External links 

 Speed Limits for New Jersey State Roads: Interstate 80

80
 New Jersey
80
80
80
80
80
80